Siamese twins or conjoined twins are identical twins whose bodies are conjoined in utero.

Siamese twins may also refer to:

 Chang and Eng Bunker the "Siamese Twins", Siamese-American conjoined twin brothers from whom the term derives
 Irreversible binomial, a pair or group of words used together in fixed order, such as fish and chips or null and void
 NGC 4567 and NGC 4568, two galaxies nicknamed the Siamese twins
 "Siamese Twins", a song from The Cure's 1982 album Pornography
 A type of crossword puzzle with two grids and two clues for each entry displayed together in random order

See also
 Siamese (disambiguation)
 Siamese connection, a pipe fitting that allows two or more fire hoses to be connected
 Dual-listed company, a corporate structure in which two corporations function as a single operating business